Critosiros (Celtic: (Great Terror), Ancient Greek: Κριτασίρος) was a king of the Celtic tribes of the Boii and Taurisci. In 59 BC The Boii and Taurisci were defeated under the leadership of Critosiros by the Dacians in today's Hungary. Burebista, the ruler of the Dacians, then demanded tribute from them. The Boii decided to move west through Noricum to settle with the Helvetii tribe in modern-day Switzerland. On the way they besieged Noreia, the capital of Noricum, but were repulsed by the Noricans. Voccio, the ruler of Noricum, then allied himself with the politically rising Roman proconsul Julius Caesar, who in turn intended to subdue all of Gaul, and defeated the Helvetii and their allies in 58 BC in the battle of Bibracte.

References

Gaulish rulers
Celtic rulers
Ancient Thrace